Askham Bryan College is a specialist land-based college based in Askham Bryan, York, England. It also has centres in Newcastle, Middlesbrough, Saltaire and Wakefield.

It was built in 1936, but not opened until after World War II as the Yorkshire Agricultural Institute. It first opened to students in 1948. The college runs courses in Agriculture, Animal Management, Veterinary Nursing, Equine, Engineering, Motorsport, Horticulture, Arboriculture, Floristry, Countryside Management, Outdoor Adventure Sport, Sport Coaching and Fitness, Uniformed Public Services and Foundation Vocational Programmes.

Newton Rigg College, based in Penrith, Cumbria, became  part of Askham Bryan College in 2011; while Liz Philip was Principal; in 2020 Tim Whitaker announced that teaching at the site would cease in July 2021.
 According to Cumbrian Lord Inglewood, the process of asset stripping may be "unlawful". Between 2016 and 2020 student numbers at Newton Rigg fell by 40%. 

Alumni include Geoffrey Smith, a horticulturalist, writer and broadcaster; and Joe Maiden, a horticulturalist and broadcaster for BBC Radio Leeds.

References

External links

 Official website

Buildings and structures completed in 1936
Education in York
Buildings and structures in York
Further education colleges in North Yorkshire
1936 establishments in England
Education in Cumbria
Agricultural universities and colleges in the United Kingdom